The 2012 Boise State Broncos football team represented Boise State University in the 2012 NCAA Division I FBS football season. The Broncos were led by head coach Chris Petersen and played their home games at Bronco Stadium. This season was Boise State's second in the Mountain West Conference. They finished the season 11–2, 7–1 in Mountain West play to share the conference championship with Fresno State and San Diego State. They were invited to and were champions of the Maaco Bowl Las Vegas for the third consecutive year, this year defeating Washington 28–26.

Previous season
The Broncos opened the season ranked #5 and #7 in the AP and coaches polls, respectively, by far the highest season starting ranking in school history and the highest starting position for a non-BCS team. They opened the season with a win against #19/#22 Georgia at Georgia Dome in one of the nation's premier games of the opening weekend. The Broncos would win their next nine games and climbed to #2 in the coaches, AP and Harris polls and #3 in the BCS poll for their highest ranking ever in all four polls. On November 12, #5 Boise State lost to their rival #24 TCU, ending the nations longest home winning streak. They were invited to the Maaco Bowl Las Vegas for the second consecutive year where they defeated Arizona State 56–24 to finish the season 12–1 and ranked #6/#8 in the coaches/AP polls.

Boise State set two records in 2011.  The Broncos became the first team in FBS history to win 50 games in a four-year span (2008–2011). Additionally,  Kellen Moore became the winningest starting quarterback in FBS history with 50 wins.  He passed former Texas quarterback Colt McCoy (45 wins).

Preseason

Award watch lists
Listed in the order that they were released.

Outland Trophy – Sr. G Joe Kellogg

Lombardi Award – Sr. G Joe Kellogg

Fred Biletnikoff Award – So. WR Matt Miller

Doak Walker Award – Sr. RB D.J. Harper

Lott Trophy – Sr. LB J.C. Percy

Mountain West media days
At the Mountain West media days, held at the Cosmopolitan in Las Vegas, Nevada, the Broncos were picked as the overwhelming favorites to win the conference title, receiving 27 of a possible 30 first place votes. This was the fifth straight year that Boise State was picked as the preseason champion of their conference. So. WR Matt Miller and Sr. OL Joe Kellog were selected to the all-conference first team offense. Sr. DL Mike Atkinson and Sr. DB Jamar Taylor were selected to the all-conference first team defense. Sr. WR Mitch Burroughs was selected as the returner of the year and as the special teams player of the year.

Media poll
 Boise State – 296 (27)
 Nevada – 244
 Fresno State – 231 (2)
 Wyoming – 213
 San Diego State – 173 (1)
 Air Force – 170
 Hawaii – 116
 Colorado State – 111
 UNLV – 63
 New Mexico – 33

Preseason polls
On August 2, Boise State was ranked #22 in preseason Coaches' poll. Their opening season opponent, Michigan State, debuted at #13. This will mark the fourth straight season that Boise State will start the season against a ranked opponent from a BCS conference (they won the previous three).

On August 18, Boise State was ranked #24 in the preseason AP poll.

Schedule

 Denotes the largest crowd in Bronco Stadium history. Previous high was 34,196 vs Air Force in 2011. This record stood until October 12, 2019 (36,902).

Game summaries

at Michigan State

Miami (OH)

BYU

at New Mexico

at Southern Miss

Fresno State

UNLV

at Wyoming

San Diego State

at Hawaii

Colorado State

at Nevada

Washington–Maaco Bowl Las Vegas

Rankings

Statistics

Scores by quarter

References

Boise State
Boise State Broncos football seasons
Mountain West Conference football champion seasons
Las Vegas Bowl champion seasons
Boise State Broncos football